A sprung cart was a light, one-horse (or more usually pony), two-wheeled vehicle with road springs, for the carriage of passengers on informal occasions. Its name varied according to the body mounted on it.

Examples were the ralli car, jaunting car, governess cart, tax cart (or taxed cart) and Whitechapel cart. Some light domestic delivery vans were also of this pattern.

An Australian spring cart was a simple cart designed for carrying goods and did not have seating for driver or passengers. The driver usually sat on the sacks or goods carried. The shafts were wider than usual to accommodate a draught horse or a part bred one.

The un-sprung cart by contrast was a simple, sturdy, one-horse, two-wheeled vehicle used by roadmen, farmers and the like for road metal or dung.

See also 
 Types of carriages

Carts